Zhovtneve was an air base in Ukraine located 11 km northeast of Volodymyr.  It served as a wartime dispersion base.  It contained a small remote parking with a few revetted areas.  This base was only about 40 km from the Polish border.

Soviet Air Force bases
Soviet Frontal Aviation
Ukrainian airbases